Falahill is a village in the Scottish Borders, in the Moorfoot Hills, at , in the Parish of Heriot, and close to the border with Midlothian.

Nearby are Gilston, the Heriot Water, Oxton, Scottish Borders, Soutra Hill, and Torquhan.

The hill serves as the origin for the name of Fala, the presidential dog of Franklin D. Roosevelt.

See also
List of places in the Scottish Borders
List of places in Scotland

External links

RCAHMS record for Falahill
RCAHMS record for Falahill, A7 Road Bridge, Bridge No. 39
 Railscot News: James Young's Photographs of Falahill 
STREETMAP for Falahill 

Villages in the Scottish Borders